Petroschmidtia is a genus of marine ray-finned fishes belonging to the family Zoarcidae, the eelpouts. The species in this genus are laced in the genus Lycodes by FishBase but Catalog of Fishes recognises this as a valid genus.

Species
There are currently 4 recognized species in this genus:
 Petroschmidtia albonotata (Taranetz & Andriashev, 1934) (Whitebar eelpout) 
 Petroschmidtia teraoi (Katayama, 1943) 
 Petroschmidtia toyamensis Katayama, 1941 
 Petroschmidtia uschakovi (Popov, 1931)

References

Lycodinae
Taxa named by Anatoly Andriyashev